Kazusa may refer to:

, former province of Japan
, former town in  Minamitakaki District, Nagasaki Prefecture, Japan

People with the given name
, Japanese voice actress
 (died 1183), Japanese samurai lord and gōzoku 
 (born 1975), Japanese voice actress
, Japanese Paralympic judoka
, Japanese model
, Japanese manga artist

Japanese feminine given names